Yauhen Biadulin (born 1 September 1985 in Mogilev, Belarus) is a Belarusian judoka. He competed at the 2012 Summer Olympics in the -100 kg event.

Biadulin has also competed in sambo and won a silver medal at the 2008 World Sambo Championships.

References

External links
 
 

1985 births
Living people
Belarusian male judoka
Olympic judoka of Belarus
Judoka at the 2012 Summer Olympics
People from Mogilev
Universiade medalists in judo
Universiade bronze medalists for Belarus
Medalists at the 2009 Summer Universiade
Sportspeople from Mogilev Region
20th-century Belarusian people
21st-century Belarusian people